La Rose may refer to:

La Rose, violin composition by Giovanni Bassano
"La Rose", salon song by Giovanni Battista Rubini (1794-1854)
La Rose (surname)
De La Rose (1978-2001), American racehorse
De la Rose (surname), surname
De La Rose Stakes, American horse race
La Rose, Illinois, village in the United States
La Rose (society), society in Saint Lucia
La Rose, la violette et le papillon, ballet

See also
Larose (surname)
Larose, Louisiana